Arichua or Arechua (possibly from Aymara or Quechua for a kind of potatoes,) is a volcano in the Andes of Peru, about  high. It is located in the Puno Region, Puno Province, in the south of the Acora District. Arichua  lies southwest of the mountain Coline and north of Quinaquinani.

See also 
 List of volcanoes in Peru

References 

Volcanoes of Peru
Mountains of Puno Region
Mountains of Peru